The 2007 Newcastle Knights season was the 20th in the club's history. They competed in the NRL's 2007 Telstra Premiership, finishing second-last.

Season summary
2007 was a year of turmoil for the Newcastle Knights club both on and off the field. After making a promising start to the season with victories over contenders such as the Canterbury Bulldogs – the club and rugby league world was rocked by the shock retirement of Andrew Johns. The departure of their captain and most influential player had an obvious effect on the team, and although they managed to stay in touch with the top eight until the last third of the season, their season was irreparably damaged by his absence. In addition to this – the Knights endured the worst injury toll in the 2007 season – fielding thirty seven players in first grade by season's end.

The club also struggled off-field, with Brian Smith's decision to release loyal clubmen such as Clint Newton (who subsequently won a grand final with the Melbourne Storm; which was later stripped due to salary cap breaches), Kirk Reynoldson, and Josh Perry (who subsequently played in Manly's 2008 premiership) meeting with displeasure from the Sydney media and some sections of the Newcastle support base. Newton's defection to Melbourne and Reynoldson's threats of legal action over the club refusing to play him in the fifteen games required to trigger his fourth contract year saw the club's reputation dragged through the mud. The Daily Telegraph campaigned strongly for the sacking of Smith whilst Bluetongue owner John Singleton also threatened legal action after the releases lead to a multimillion-dollar advertising campaign being cancelled. To cap it all off, Andrew Johns again made the press late in the season after being arrested for ecstasy possession in the United Kingdom and confessing to having been a drug addict for the entirety of his playing career.

Despite these pressures, the Knights managed to avoid a second wooden spoon in three years – offloading the dreaded piece of 'silverware' to the Penrith Panthers with a last round victory over the Wests Tigers.

Ladder

Fixtures

Trial matches

Regular season

Players

References

Newcastle Knights seasons
Newcastle Knights season